Dejan Panovski (Macedonian: Дејан Пановски; born 30 April 1980) is a Macedonian Alpine skier. He competed in two events at the 2002 Winter Olympics.

References

External links
 

1980 births
Living people
Macedonian male alpine skiers
Olympic alpine skiers of North Macedonia
Alpine skiers at the 2002 Winter Olympics
Sportspeople from Skopje